Kapitanivka is an urban-type settlement in Novoukrainka Raion of Kirovohrad Oblast in Ukraine. It is located on the banks of the Rozlyvna, a tributary of the Velyka Vys, in the drainage basin of the Southern Bug, at the border with Cherkasy Oblast. Kapitanivka belongs to Novomyrhorod urban hromada, one of the hromadas of Ukraine. Population: 

Until 18 July 2020, Kapitanivka belonged to Novomyrhorod Raion. The raion was abolished in July 2020 as part of the administrative reform of Ukraine, which reduced the number of raions of Kirovohrad Oblast to four. The area of Novomyrhorod Raion was merged into Novoukrainka Raion.

Economy

Transportation
Kapitanivka railway station is on the railway connecting Smila and Pomichna. There is infrequent passenger traffic.

The settlement is connected by road with Novomyrhorod and Smila.

People from Kapitanivka 
 Alyona Alyona (born 1991), Ukrainian rapper

References

Urban-type settlements in Novoukrainka Raion